Martijn van Oostrum (born 27 May 1976) is a Dutch judoka.

Achievements

See also
European Judo Championships
History of martial arts
List of judo techniques
List of judoka
Martial arts timeline

References

External links
 

1976 births
Living people
Dutch male judoka
Place of birth missing (living people)
Sportspeople from Nijmegen